The Easter Island Foundation is an American non-profit organization that promotes the conservation and protection of the fragile cultural heritage of Rapa Nui (Easter Island) and other Polynesian islands through education. The foundation was created in 1989 to give back to a community that has inspired the world with its rich history, vibrant culture and monumental treasures.

History of Easter Island 
Easter Island's long isolation was ended on Easter Sunday, 1722, when a Dutch explorer, Jacob Roggeveen, discovered the island. He named it for the Holy day. One can only imagine the astonishment of the islanders as the first ships appeared on the horizon. The Dutch, in turn, were amazed by the great statues, which they thought were made from clay.

A Spanish Captain, Don Felipe Gonzales, was the next to land at Easter Island, in 1770. He claimed the island for the King of Spain. The famed English explorer, Captain James Cook, stopped briefly in 1774, and a French admiral and explorer, La Perouse, spent 11 hours on the island in 1786. These early visitors spent little actual time on the island. They were searching for water, wood, and food but the island had few of these items and it also lacked a safe anchorage. They soon sailed onward. None of the early visitors saw the famous quarry where the statues were carved. Some noted that the land seemed well-cultivated, with fields neatly laid out. Comments were made of the unusual boat-shaped houses, and nearly all mentioned the lack of serviceable canoes.

Disaster arrived in the 1860's when Peruvian slavers came, looking for captives to sell in Peru. Easter Island was not the only island to suffer but it was the hardest hit because it was closest to the South American coast. Eight ships arrived to Easter Island in December 1862. About 80 seamen assembled on the beach while trade goods such as necklaces, mirrors and other items were spread out. At a signal, guns were fired and islanders were caught, tied up, and carried off to the ships. In the confusion, at least ten Rapanui were killed. A second and third landing was attempted in the following days, but defensive measures forced a retreat back to the ships. More than 1400 Rapanui islanders were kidnapped. Some were sold in Peru as domestic servants; others for manual labor on the plantations. Food was inadequate and discipline harsh; medical care was virtually non-existent. Islanders sickened and died. As word of the activities of the slavers spread, public opinion in Peru became hostile to this trade in human beings. Newspapers wrote angry editorials and the French Government and missionary societies protested. Convinced that the entire "immigration scheme" was damaging the reputation of Peru in the eyes of the rest of the world, the Peruvian Government announced that they would henceforth "prohibit the introduction of Polynesian settlers".

Like so many Polynesian islands, Easter Island was notorious for shipwrecks that ultimately impacted island life. Usually the effects (an increase in births) were felt in the months after the shipwrecked crews had been rescued. The Huntwell was wrecked in February 1871, leaving twelve men stranded on the island. The Indiaman sank off Easter on March 19, 1872, stranding some 30 persons on the island. It was two months before they were picked up by another ship. In 1892, when the Clorinda foundered off the island, survivors were stranded for three months.

An ethnologist, Alfred Metraux, came to Easter Island as part of the Franco-Belgian Expedition (1934–35). Accompanied by Henri Lavachery, an archaeologist, Metraux gathered legends, traditions, and myths along with information on the material culture; his work has become a standard reference for the island's past. Metraux's books resulted in focusing the world's attention on the island (See Ethnology of Easter Island, 1971).

Background of the Foundation

The Easter Island Foundation (EIF) was organized in 1989 by a group of concerned scientists and interested persons who together were inspired by Polynesia's incomparable archaeological treasures. Among its many projects, the Foundation established the William Mulloy Library on the island and continues to support its operations.

Mission 
Easter Island is isolated in the vast Pacific Ocean, half way between Tahiti and South America. It contains spectacular archaeological wonders, many of which have been studied by scientists from all over the world. Even today, many of its mysteries remain unsolved and much work remains to be done. However, increased tourism, development and lack of infrastructure threaten its priceless heritage.

The Easter Island Foundation aims to build a solid endowment to assure the continuation of its projects by preserving this unique isolated island, its archaeological treasures and its living culture.

Objectives of the Foundation

 To promote an interest in research on Easter Island and other Pacific islands by anthropologists, archaeologists, linguists, environmentalists, and members of other scientific, historical, and cultural disciplines.
 To work toward the conservation and preservation of Easter Island's cultural heritage and environmental character as well as historic sites and monuments in Polynesia.
 To inform and educate local, national, and international groups and communities in addition to the general public with regard to Easter Island's unique heritage and priceless monumental treasures.
 To facilitate communication about Easter Island and other Pacific islands among scientific disciplines, historians, and other interested parties through publication of journals, books, guides, and other media-related sources and conferences.
 To develop an endowment fund through investments, bequests, corporate and Easter Island Foundation contributions, and other related sources — to provide a pool of financial resources for the support of the Foundation's programs.
 To help support the William Mulloy Library for the study of Easter Island and various related disciplines, in association with the island's Museo Antropológico Padre Sebastián Englert.
 To provide a scholarship program for promising Rapa Nui secondary and college students to ensure them an opportunity for advanced academic studies.
 To encourage economic development activities on Easter Island that will benefit the Rapa Nui and that will honor and maintain the cultural and environmental character of the island.

The Foundation's activities
 
The EIF funds archaeological research on Rapa Nui and other Polynesian islands, provides Rapa Nui students with scholarships, books and equipment, and publishes a series of books about Rapa Nui and Polynesia. The Foundation is best known for publishing the Rapa Nui Journal, a unique source of information about Easter Island and Polynesia. The EIF also sponsors conferences about Rapa Nui and Polynesia.

External links
 Easter Island Foundation
 William Mulloy Library 
 Father Sebastian Englert Anthropology Museum
 Fonck Museum

References 

Easter Island
Nature conservation organizations based in the United States
Environmental organizations established in 1989
Organizations established in 1989
1989 establishments in Easter Island
1989 establishments in Chile